Escadron de Transport 88 Larzac is a French Air and Space Force squadron located at Djibouti–Ambouli International Airport, Djibouti City, Djibouti which operates the Aérospatiale SA 330 Puma and the CASA/IPTN CN-235.

See also

 List of French Air and Space Force aircraft squadrons

References

French Air and Space Force squadrons